Burrinjuck Power Station is a hydroelectric power station at Burrinjuck Dam, New South Wales, Australia.

The power station was commenced in 1927, running two  turbines. In 1938, an additional two 5 MW turbines were added at the dam wall. In 1972, floods damaged the original two turbines, which were decommissioned.

Notes

External links 
Eraring Energy page on Burrinjuck

Energy infrastructure completed in 1927
Hydroelectric power stations in New South Wales